Capers is both a surname and a given name. Notable people with the name include:

Surname:
 Dom Capers (born 1950), American football coach
 Ellison Capers (1837–1908), American school teacher
 Jean Murrell Capers (1913-2017), American judge
 Legrand G. Capers (1834–1877), American physician
 Virginia Capers (1925–2004), Tony Award-winning American actress
 Wayne Capers (born 1961), former professional American football player

Given name:
 Capers Funnye (born 1952) Jewish African-American rabbi
 Capers Jones, specialist in software engineering methodologies